Lalar and Katak Rural District ( – Dehestan Lalar va Katak) is a rural district (dehestan) in Chelo District, Andika County, Khuzestan Province, Iran. At the 2006 census, its population was 3,991, in 670 families.  The rural district has 29 villages.

References 

Rural Districts of Khuzestan Province
Andika County